The court officials of the Kingdom of Navarre, five in number, were in charge of the smooth functioning of various aspects of the royal court at Pamplona. In the tenth and eleventh centuries these officials were often the youthful sons of the high nobility, for whom a period at court served as an education. Officials were often rotated, but rarely can their dates of appointment be determined precisely. Rather they are known from the official Latin titles by which they were known in royal charters, to which they often appeared as witnesses. While earlier officials tended to move on to inherit lordships and leave court, in the late eleventh century individuals appear in the same office for longer periods of time and may have been appointed for life. 

The chronological lists below are not exhaustive, since there exist large gaps in the historical record. The Latin title connected to an office could vary. Instances where the same official bore a different title are noted, as are the dates of the atypical charters. 

In 1362 the court officials of Charles II were the butler, herald, chamberlain, chamber clerk, majordomo, chaplains, chef, cup-bearer, treasurer ( or ), butcher, confessor, pages, equerry, and grooms.

Majordomo
The majordomo (Latin ) was the chief officer of the court, who oversaw all the other officers. The office may have been held on a rotational basis, since several officials appear in and out of office. One majordomo held the post of butler simultaneously, as evidenced by a charter of 1072.

Cup-bearer
The cup-bearer (Latin pincerna, architriclinus, or propinator) was the official in charge of keeping the royal court fed. Like the office of majordomo this one may have been rotational.

Butler
The butler (Latin botellarius or botecarius) was the official in charge of the wine cellar, much like a modern wine steward. One butler held the post of majordomo simultaneously, as evidenced by a charter of 1072. There is no direct evidence in the charter record of rotation of this office, but several individuals appear to have been both butler and cup-bearer at different times.

Armour-Bearer
The armour-bearer (Latin armiger or armentarius) was in charge of the royal armoury and possibly also the king's guard. The connection with weaponry is visible in the list of synonyms for this term, all of which contain the Latin root fer-, signifying iron: alferiz, fertorarius, inferartis, and offertor. This office changed hands with higher frequency than the others, and there is also evidence of rotation. It is the only office for which two officers are cited in the same charter: Fortún Jiménez and Ortí Ortiz were both inferartes in a charter of 1043.

Marshal
The marshal (Latin stabularius) had charge of the royal stables. While there is no direct evidence of rotation in this office, no individual held it for more than three years.

Notes

Sources

Navarre
Lists of office-holders
Navarre Court officials